In Greek mythology, Idaea or Idaia (Ancient Greek: Ἰδαία means 'she who comes from Ida' or 'she who lives on Ida') was a nymph, presumably of Mount Ida in the ancient Troad region of western Anatolia (in modern-day Turkey). She was the mother, by the river-god Scamander, of Teucer, who was the first to rule as a king over the region known later as Troy.

Trojan descendants

Notes

References
 Apollodorus, Apollodorus, The Library, with an English Translation by Sir James George Frazer, F.B.A., F.R.S. in 2 Volumes. Cambridge, MA, Harvard University Press; London, William Heinemann Ltd. 1921.  Online version at the Perseus Digital Library.
 Diodorus Siculus, Diodorus Siculus: The Library of History. Translated by C. H. Oldfather. Twelve volumes. Loeb Classical Library. Cambridge, MA: Harvard University Press; London: William Heinemann, Ltd. 1989. Online version by Bill Thayer
 Grimal, Pierre, The Dictionary of Classical Mythology, Wiley-Blackwell, 1996, .
 Tripp, Edward, Crowell's Handbook of Classical Mythology, Thomas Y. Crowell Co; First edition (June 1970). 

Nymphs